The Love Guru is a 2008 American romantic comedy film directed by Marco Schnabel in his directorial debut, written and produced by Mike Myers, and starring Myers, Jessica Alba, Justin Timberlake, Romany Malco, Meagan Good, Verne Troyer, John Oliver, Omid Djalili, and Ben Kingsley. The film was a financial failure, grossing $40 million on a budget of $62 million, and was panned by both critics and audiences. It also won 3 Razzie Awards including Worst Picture.

The Guru Pitka (Mike Myers) is tasked with revitalizing the Toronto Maple Leafs hockey team. The team has been plagued with losses and their star player suffers a marital tragedy that throws him off his game. In order for Pitka to become the next Deepak Chopra, he must help the team actualize their potential to win the Stanley Cup.

Plot

Guru Pitka is the self proclaimed "number-two guru in the world", after Deepak Chopra. A flashback shows that Pitka was an orphan, taught by Guru Tugginmypudha. When the twelve year old Pitka announces he wants to become a guru so that girls will love him, Tugginmypudha puts a chastity belt on him until he can learn that loving himself is more important than being loved by others. Pitka asks if he can still masturbate but is warned if he attempts to he  will become blind with strabismus like Tugginmypudha. 

Pitka's dream is to become the number-one guru and appear on The Oprah Winfrey Show. He lives a charmed life with thousands of followers, including the celebrities Jessica Simpson, Val Kilmer and Mariska Hargitay (whose name is used as a faux-Hindi greeting, even to Hargitay herself). Pitka's teachings, which involve simplistic acronyms and plays on words, are displayed in PowerPoint slide shows.

In Canada, Jane Bullard inherits the Toronto Maple Leafs hockey team, who are on a losing streak. The team's star player, Darren Roanoke, has been playing badly ever since his wife Prudence left him for Los Angeles Kings goaltender Jacques "Lè Coq" Grandé. Jane is a big fan of Pitka's, and offers to pay him $2 million to patch up Darren's marriage, so the team can win the Stanley Cup. Pitka's agent tells him that if he succeeds, Oprah will have him on her show. Pitka meets the team coach Cherkoff who is there with Jane for his seminar, Pitka mocks his dwarfism.

Pitka and Jane bond on the plane ride. Jane became a fan of Pitka's work due to the death of her father. Jane admits she has a crush on him and Pitka asks if she has a husband or a boyfriend, to which she says no. Pitka asks if she is a lesbian, she chuckles but admits to experimenting once in college which causes Pitka to get an erection and his chastity belt loudly clanks. He grimaces in discomfort and crosses his leg over his lap.

Pitka encourages the rival team to beat Darren up during a game, to distract him from his distress over his wife's affair. Darren begins to play well but then gets suspended for the next two games after beating up Lè Coq, and hitting Coach Cherkov with a hockey puck.

Later, Pitka has dinner with Jane. He has his assistant Rajneesh prepare a dish called “nuts in a sling“ which is two lychee nuts in a dough pouch resembling a scrotum, the first step is whacking it with a mallet, Pitka moans and groans in pain until he stops Rajneesh by shouting his safe word. Next it is dipped in hot oily water. Pitka groans in pain but then he moans and chuckles orgasmically. Pitka tries to kiss Jane, only for his Erection to bonk against the Chastity belt causing it  chastity belt to ding again. He gasps and she becomes upset  when he tells her their love cannot be, she runs out. Pitka advises Darren to write an apology to Prudence, and fights off a rooster to deliver the letter. After they lose three games due to Pitka’s odd methods and antics plus mistreatment of him Coach Cherkov berates Jane and punches Pitka in the groin. He is slightly injured from hitting the chastity belt shaking his fist but the belt does not protect Pitka as his testicles are stretched apart in the chastity belt and he is already suffering from thirty three years of blue balls. Pitka groans and grabs his crotch hunching over.  He shouts Omar Sharif's name in vain and drops to the ground. He throws a tantrum about the pain in his balls, he tearfully grumbles and calls Cherkoff a prick. Cherkoff tells him "stay down bitch", fearing another groin attack Pitka responds "okay" submissively.  Pitka chases after Jane as she says Cherkoff is right and Pitka tries to gaslight her into optimism bias but she yells at him to do his job with fixing Darren.

Dick Pants warns Pitka to hurry up the process or he will lose his spot on Oprah again to Deepak Chopra. Pitka is adamant that Darren is not ready. Pitka and Darren attempt a confrontation, but her invective ends up scaring both of them away. Pitka helps Darren realise that since his mother only showed him love when he succeeded he had grown to believe Prudence would only love him as long as he won. Pitka then drives himself and Darren to Niagara Falls for a "Heart to Heart".

With time running out, Pitka distracts Lè Coq with his idol, Celine Dion, then tells Prudence that Darren stood up to his mom, encouraging her to return to her husband. During the lead up to the final game, Lè Coq, having heard that Darren cannot play with his mother in the audience, gets her to sing the national anthem, causing Darren to flee. At the airport on his way to guest on Oprah, Pitka sees the news on television and defies his agent by going back to help Darren. Pitka reveals to Jane his chastity belt to explain why he pulled away from her, and Jane reveals that she is understanding of his spiritual vow. 

After smoothing things over with his mother, Darren recovers until Lè Coq brags that Prudence prefers him in bed. Darren freezes and Pitka realizes he needs another distraction, which he provides by getting two elephants to have sex in the middle of the rink, in front of the live television audience (which Pitka claimed would distract anybody). Darren wakes up from his stupor and scores the winning goal. After the game, Coach Cherkov apologizes for the groin attack, Pitka offers a hug but as Cherkoff obliges he punches him in the face and threatens to beat him up if he ever attacks him again. They then make up and  become friends. He then meets Deepak Chopra and decides that he is fine with being the first Guru Pitka instead of the next Deepak Chopra.

Back in India, Tugginmypudha tells Pitka that he has finally learned to love himself and removes Pitka's chastity belt, revealing there was a hook in the back. The film ends with Jane and Pitka dancing together in a Bollywood-style number to a rendition of "The Joker".

Cast
 Mike Myers as Guru Maurice Pitka / Himself – Pitka is the 2nd top guru behind Deepak Chopra. After his parents, two dog groomers turned missionaries, died at 12, he was sent to live in a small village in India. He initially aspired to be a guru to be a lothario. His guru has him forced into a vow of celibacy until he learns self love and many other humiliating tasks, thirty three years later in present time, with a chance to finally be on The Oprah Winfrey Show, he is hired to travel to America to fix the relationship of Darren and Prudence. 
 Jessica Alba as Jane Bullard, the owner of the Toronto Maple Leafs, an heir to her father who died. She is disliked by fans of the team, she is a big fan of Pitka's work helping her through her grief with her father. She is also attracted to him. He falls in love with her at first sight.
 Justin Timberlake as Jacques "Le Coq" Grandé, the rival goalie. He is dating Darren's wife. He is famous for being well endowed.
 Romany Malco as Darren Roanoke, when his love life in shambles, Pitka aids him in fixing his relationship.
 Meagan Good as Prudence Roanoke, Darren's wife and Jacques' lover.
 Verne Troyer as Coach Punch Cherkov, the coach of the Maple Leafs. He is short tempered and dislikes Pitka due to his cruel jokes about his dwarfism. 
 Omid Djalili as Guru Satchabigknoba / Gagandeep Singh, a rival guru to Pitka. His scenes were cut from the film.
 Ben Kingsley as Guru Tugginmypudha, the quirky guru of Pitka. He is severely cross eyed due to excessive masturbation. 
 Telma Hopkins as Lillian Roanoke, Darren's overbearing mother. 
 Manu Narayan as Rajneesh, Pitka's assistant and closest friend. 
 John Oliver as Richard "Dick" Pants, Pitka's greedy agent.
 Stephen Colbert as Jay Kell, an NHL hockey announcer and drug addict.
 Jim Gaffigan as Trent Lueders, an NHL hockey announcer.
 Rob Huebel as Bar Patron
 Daniel Tosh as Cowboy Hat
 Samantha Bee as Cinnabon cashier

As themselves
 Mariska Hargitay
 Jessica Simpson
 Kanye West
 Val Kilmer (uncredited)
 Rob Blake
 Deepak Chopra
 Oprah Winfrey (voice)

Music
The original score for the film was composed by George S. Clinton, who also composed the score for the Austin Powers films, also starring, written and produced by Mike Myers. Clinton recorded it with an eighty piece ensemble of the Hollywood Studio Symphony at Warner Bros.

The song "Dhadak Dhadak" from the Bollywood film of 2005, Bunty Aur Babli, was used in the trailer.

The songs "9 to 5", "More Than Words", and "The Joker" are all in the film (performed by Myers and with sitar accompaniment) and on the soundtrack. "Brimful of Asha" was also used in the film.

Promotion
Myers appeared in the seventh season finale of American Idol as Pitka, the "spiritual director" of that show. The finalists David Cook and David Archuleta got to visit the Paramount Pictures studio theatre to see The Love Guru a month prior to its release and then got to meet Myers dressed like Pitka and playing "Sitar Hero".

A "Fan Resource Page" at Fox Entertainment's beliefnet.com website was "created as part of a collaboration between Beliefnet and Paramount Pictures."

Reception

Box office
The film did poorly at the box office. In its opening weekend, The Love Guru grossed $13.9 million in 3,012 theaters in the United States and Canada, ranking #4 at the box office behind Get Smart, The Incredible Hulk, and Kung Fu Panda, falling short of the $20 million range forecast by Hollywood pundits. The film grossed $32.2 million in the United States and Canada and an additional $8.7 million overseas, for a total of $40.8 million worldwide, against its $62 million budget. When the film was released in the United Kingdom, it ranked only #8 on the opening weekend.

Critical response
The review aggregator Rotten Tomatoes gave The Love Guru an approval rating of 13%, based on 177 reviews, with an average rating of 3.5/10. The website's critical consensus reads, "The Love Guru features far too many gross-out gags, and too few earned laughs, ranking as one of Mike Myers' poorest outings." Metacritic reported the film had an average score of 24 out of 100, based on 33 critics, indicating "generally unfavorable reviews". Audiences polled by CinemaScore gave the film a grade "B -" on scale of A to F.

Jay Stone of the National Post gave the film one star and said the film "is shockingly crass, sloppy, repetitive and thin." Stone said "Chopra is used almost as a product placement, taking a proud spot alongside a circus, a brand of cinnamon buns, the Leafs and, of course, Mike Myers." Stone also wrote, "the sitar based versions of pop songs like '9 to 5' are oddly watchable – but mostly the film is 88 minutes of ridiculous sight gags and obscene puns."

A. O. Scott of The New York Times wrote "The word 'unfunny' surely applies to Mr. Myers's obnoxious attempts to find mirth in physical and cultural differences but does not quite capture the strenuous unpleasantness of his performance. No, The Love Guru is downright antifunny, an experience that makes you wonder if you will ever laugh again." Scott also commented that the appearance of actress Mariska Hargitay was anticlimactic. An ongoing gag in the film is the use of "Mariska Hargitay" as a phony Hindi greeting.

Roger Ebert gave the film 1 out of 4 stars, writing, "Myers has made some funny movies, but this film could have been written on toilet walls by callow adolescents. Every reference to a human sex organ or process of defecation is not automatically funny simply because it is naughty, but Myers seems to labor under that delusion."

Harry Knowles of Ain't It Cool News wrote a highly negative review, saying The Love Guru "isn't merely a bad film, but a painful experience." He considered it one of the worst films of at least the past several years and also declared it might ruin Myers's career.

Mick LaSalle of San Francisco Chronicle was one of the few major critics who did not write the film off completely, stating "Mike Myers' new comedy, "The Love Guru," is a disappointment, but it's not a disaster, and that's at least something."

Myers later poked fun at the film's failure in an appearance on the December 20, 2014 episode of Saturday Night Live, where he appeared as Dr. Evil (a character from his far more successful Austin Powers series), giving advice to Sony Pictures on its cancellation of the release of The Interview: "if you really want to put a bomb in a theater, do what I did: put in The Love Guru."

Accolades

Portrayal of Hinduism
Before the film's release, some Hindus expressed unhappiness about how Hindus are portrayed, the disrespect of their culture and the bad impression that it would give those not well exposed to Hinduism, while some gave a cautious welcome, asking other Hindus to look at it as satire and not the truth. Rajan Zed, a Hindu leader from Nevada, demanded that Paramount Pictures screen the film for members of the Hindu community before its release.

Based on the movie's trailer and MySpace page, Zed said The Love Guru "appears to be lampooning Hinduism and Hindus" and uses sacred terms frivolously. He told The Associated Press, "People are not very well versed in Hinduism, so this might be their only exposure...They will have an image in their minds of stereotypes. They will think most of us are like that."

Paramount Pictures agreed to provide the Hindu American Foundation an opportunity to pre screen the film as soon as it had a complete work print of the film, but did not do this. Instead, it requested the Foundation attend a Minneapolis pre-screening the night before the film's release. HAF agreed to view the film to be able to inform the American Hindu community in light of concerned inquiries that were reported to its national headquarters. The reviewers concluded that the film was vulgar and crude but not necessarily anti-Hindu.

References

External links

 
 
 

2008 films
2008 romantic comedy films
American romantic comedy films
Films set in Toronto
Films shot in Toronto
American ice hockey films
Hinduism in pop culture-related controversies
Los Angeles Kings
American sports comedy films
Spyglass Entertainment films
Toronto Maple Leafs
Paramount Pictures films
Films produced by Michael De Luca
Films scored by George S. Clinton
Films with screenplays by Mike Myers
Films set in India
2008 directorial debut films
Golden Raspberry Award winning films
Religious controversies in film
Race-related controversies in film
Casting controversies in film
Film controversies
Film controversies in the United States
2000s English-language films
2000s American films